Lawn is a Dutch Alternative-Indie rock band. They have released three albums: Lawn-dro-mat (2000), Backspace (2003) and Silver (2008). Their song Fix (from Backspace) includes a duet with Anneke van Giersbergen, the former vocalist from fellow Dutch band The Gathering.

Current band members
Job van 't Veer - vocals/guitars
Titus van 't Veer - vocals/guitars
Maarten - bass/keys
Okkie - drums

Discography
Lawn-dro-mat (2000)

Marshmellow (03:35)
Roadkill (05:57)
June (07:01)
Saved (03:56)
90 Sec (01:32)
Altitude (05:25)
Mountaineer (08:17)
Big Exit (03:51)

Backspace (2003)

Tide (03:46)
Fix (04:41)
Winter (06:27)
Silverscreen (04:42)
Mercury (03:37)
Backspace (05:57)
Frontseat (03:16)
Polaroid (05:34)
Neon (13:13)

Fix single/EP 

fix (edit)
tide
fix (redec.)
fix (video)

Silver (2008)

Downstream (03:35)
Yesteryear (04:23)
Sanctuary (04:51)
Rear View (04:03)
Silver Lining (05:13)
Peace (04:50)
The Sea (05:49)
A Random Thought (09:11)

Videos
Their only known video is for the duet Fix, directed by Mirka Duyn.

External links
http://www.lawn.nl

Dutch alternative rock groups